Margaret Etim (born 28 November 1992) is a Nigerian sprinter specialising in the 400 metres. She won the silver medal at the 2010 World Junior Championships in addition to multiple medals with the Nigerian 4 × 400 metres relay.

Her personal best in the event is 51.24 seconds set in Makurdi in 2010.

Competition record

References

1992 births
Living people
Nigerian female sprinters
Commonwealth Games competitors for Nigeria
Athletes (track and field) at the 2010 Commonwealth Games
World Athletics Championships athletes for Nigeria
Athletes (track and field) at the 2011 All-Africa Games
Athletes (track and field) at the 2015 African Games
African Games competitors for Nigeria
21st-century Nigerian women